Nungshi Feijei (English: Romantic Wrong Turn) is a 2015 Indian Meitei language film directed by Chou-En-Lai and produced by Ab Atom. The film features Gurumayum Bonny, Khaba, Mukabala (Loya), Soma Laishram, Biju Ningombam and Ithoi Oinam in the lead roles. The story of the film was written by Nanao and screenplay by Chaiba. The film is a remake of the 2013 Tollywood (Telugu) film Gunde Jaari Gallanthayyinde. Nungshi Feijei was released at Bhagyachandra Open Air Theatre (BOAT), Imphal, on 7 December 2015.
A sequel to the film titled Nungshi Feijei 2 was released in October 2016.

Cast
 Gurumayum Bonny as Meiraba
 Khaba
 Mukabala (Loya) as Chaoren
 Soma Laishram as Nungshibi
 Biju Ningombam as Mangalleima
 Ithoi Oinam as Thoi
 Idhou
 Huirem Manglem as Mangalleima's father
 Ibomcha
 Chaiba

Production
The production house, Dreams Entertainment, has also produced films which are among the hits. Among them, Bonny-Artina starrer Mongpham and Bonny-Sushmita-Artina starrer Nungshibase Phagi Natte may be mentioned. The blessing ceremony (yaipha thouni thouram) was held on 4 May 2015. The film is presented by ISTV Network and Poknapham.

Soundtrack
Bishow Ch. composed the soundtrack for the film and Paresh Laishram and Kenedy Laishram wrote the lyrics. The songs are titled Machoi Machoi Eigi Waheina and Chamlaba Thamoido Utlammu Eingonda.

References

2010s Meitei-language films
2015 films
Meitei remakes of Telugu films